Oare Marshes is a   Local Nature Reserve north of Faversham in Kent. It is owned and managed by Kent Wildlife Trust. It is part of The Swale  Nature Conservation Review site, Grade I, National Nature Reserve, Ramsar internationally important wetland site, Special Protection Area under the European Union Directive on the Conservation of Wild Birds, and Site of Special Scientific Interest.

Access

Car parking is provided opposite the Watch House, near the sea wall at the end of the Harty Ferry Road. Access is restricted to the public footpath and nature trail to minimise disturbance to roosting, feeding and breeding birds. The whole reserve may be observed from the nature trail and viewing hides. For those who need to use a car or wheelchair, there is a disabled only car park 300m from the hide overlooking the east flood. This hide is wheelchair accessible, and reached along firm level paths. There is also good viewing from the road itself, especially over the east flood. A nature trail leaflet is available on request.

Points of interest

The reserve consists of over 81 hectares of grazing marsh with freshwater dykes, open water 'scrapes', seawall and saltmarsh on the mainland opposite the Isle of Sheppey. The land, which is known for its tranquil remoteness from nearby Faversham, was used from 1787 until 1916 for the manufacture of gunpowder and the remains of its jetty are still visible. The Harty Ferry to Sheppey previously operated from near the wild-life lookout point on the reserve. The muddy Oare Creek forms the eastern edge of the reserve and lead inland to the village of Oare. The Oare and Faversham Creeks are open for navigation at high tide. There is a history of boat building and repair of historic boats and Thames Sailing Barges in the creeks. Close to Oare village is the Oare Meadow, also operated, like the Oare Marshes reserve by the Kent Wildlife Trust.

Birds
The reserve is of international importance for migratory, over wintering and breeding wetland birds. Suitable habitat is achieved through manipulation of water levels and livestock grazing. The reserve supports an exciting and diverse range of birds. Amongst the breeding species found here are pied avocet, common redshank, common snipe, northern lapwing, water rail, bearded reedling, common tern and garganey.  Migrating species include black-tailed godwit, ruff, little stint, curlew sandpiper and whimbrel.  Overwintering species include brent goose, dunlin, Eurasian curlew, Eurasian wigeon, merlin, hen harrier, short-eared owl, Eurasian bittern and twite.

See also
 South Swale nature reserve - covers the marshes east of Faversham

References

External links

Faversham site on Oare Marshes reserve with links about gunpowder works
Oare Marshes photo group - on Flickr
RSPB & Kent Wildlife Trust site on Oare Marshes Nature Reserve

Kent Wildlife Trust
Local Nature Reserves in Kent